Berlin's Federal Ribbon is an architectural ensemble that runs across the government district north of the Reichstag building across the  on the edge of the Spreebogenpark. The concept was designed by the architects Axel Schultes and Charlotte Frank.

Overview
The ribbon of buildings is approximately 900 metres long. From the air, all the buildings belonging to it appear like a massive white bar that lies across the arch of the river Spree and crosses the Spree twice. The impression of the connection is reinforced by the bridges over the Spree between the buildings of the band.

The individual elements (from west to east) are:
 the Kanzlerpark, on the right bank of the Spree, with helicopter landing facility
 the Federal Chancellery, on the left bank of the Spree, including the elongated office wing
 the vacant lot of the originally planned Citizens' Forum (abandoned,  now urban space)

Originally it was planned to extend the line, crossing the Spree a third time to Berlin Friedrichstraße station, but this plan was abandoned for cost reasons and because the station would have had to be converted beforehand. The extension was originally supposed to be completed in mid-2015. After considerable delays, the completion date will only be limited to the period up to 2021. 

The plan for the Citizens' Forum has been abandoned; instead the road connection, which was previously provisional, will be made permanent.

References

External links 
 

Buildings and structures in Berlin